São Tomé and Príncipe Sign Language (LGSTP) is a village sign language of the island state of São Tomé and Príncipe.

References

Ana Mineiro, Patrícia do Carmo, Cristina Caroça, Mara Moita, Sara Carvalho, João Paço & Ahmed Zaky (2017) Emerging linguistic features of Sao Tome and Principe Sign Language. Sign Language & Linguistics 20, 109–128.

Village sign languages
Languages of São Tomé and Príncipe